This article is a detailed listing of releases by the indie pop band The Apples in Stereo.

Discography

Studio albums
Fun Trick Noisemaker (May 2, 1995)
Tone Soul Evolution (September 30, 1997)
Her Wallpaper Reverie (June 8, 1999)
The Discovery of a World Inside the Moone (April 18, 2000)
Velocity of Sound (October 8, 2002)
New Magnetic Wonder (February 6, 2007)
Travellers in Space and Time (April 20, 2010)

EPs
Tidal Wave 7" (June 1993)
Hypnotic Suggestion EP (1994)
Look Away + 4 (February 22, 2000)
Let's Go! (July 17, 2001)

Live albums
Live in Chicago (2001)

Compilation albums
Science Faire (1996)
Sound Effects (September 4, 2001)
Electronic Projects for Musicians (April 1, 2008)
#1 Hits Explosion (September 1, 2009)

Singles
"Time for Bed/I Know You'll Do Well" (1994) 7" split single with The Olivia Tremor Control
"Onto Something" (1996) 7" split single with Sportsguitar
"Man You Gotta Get Up" (1998) 7" single
"Everybody Let Up" (2000) 7" single 
"The Bird That You Can't See" (2000) 7"/Promo CD single
"Please" (2002) CD single
"That's Something I Do" (2002) Promo CD single
"On Your Own" (2002) Promo CD single
"Holiday Mood" (2006) Digital download (MP3)
"Colors" (2007) 7" Split single with Patience Please
"Dance Floor" (2010) CD single

Miscellaneous releases
"Too Much Now", The Horizon Center, (1993)
"Avril En Mai", Pop Romantique (1999)
"Signal in the Sky (Let's Go)", The Powerpuff Girls: Heroes and Villains (2000); also featured in the series' fourth-season episode "Superfriends"
"The Oasis", Kindercore Fifty: We Thank You (2002)
"Liza Jane", Dimension Mix (2005)
"The Apples in Stereo Theme", website release (2006)
"Stephen, Stephen", MySpace site download (2006)
"Helium", YepRoc exclusive download (2006)
"Mirror", YepRoc exclusive download (2006)
"No One Can See Me Like You Do", Yes, I'm a Witch (2007)
"Atom Bomb", YepRoc exclusive download (2007)
"B.B.W. (Remix)", Miki Furukawa - BONDAGE HEART REMIXES (2008)
"That's My Family", Yo Gabba Gabba! Hey! (2017); also featured in the series' second-season episode "Family"

Discographies of American artists
Pop music group discographies